William Goodell (1792–1867) was an American missionary.  He was born at Templeton, Mass., educated at Phillips Academy (Andover), Dartmouth College, and Andover Theological Seminary.  He was accepted as a missionary by the American Board and at the close of 1822 sailed for Malta and thence the next year went to Beirut, where he aided in establishing the station which became the center of the Syrian mission.  In 1828, on account of threatened war between England and Turkey, the missionaries removed to Malta, where Goodell labored in preparing and printing books for the mission;  until, in 1831, the way having been opened by the destruction of the Turkish fleet at Navarino, he went to Constantinople, where he commenced the Armeno-Turkish mission.  During his missionary life he and his devoted wife cheerfully endured many trials and perils and were compelled to move their residence 33 times in 29 years.  One of his chief labors was the translation of the Bible into Armeno-Turkish (Turkish written in Armenian letters), in making and revising which he spent 20 years.  In 1865, after 43 years of toil, he returned to the United States and died in Philadelphia at the residence of his son, Dr. William Goodell, on February 18, 1867.  Consult his life by Prime (New York, 1876).

References

 

Translators of the Bible into Turkish
American Protestant missionaries
1792 births
1867 deaths
Protestant missionaries in Malta
Protestant missionaries in Syria
People from Templeton, Massachusetts
19th-century American translators
American expatriates in the Ottoman Empire
Protestant missionaries in the Ottoman Empire
Protestant missionaries in Lebanon
Protestant missionaries in Turkey
Missionary linguists